Ro-111 was an Imperial Japanese Navy Ro-100-class submarine. Completed and commissioned in July 1943, she served in World War II, operating in the Indian Ocean — where she sank a cargo ship and a troopship — and off the Admiralty Islands in the Pacific Ocean. She was sunk in June 1944 during her fifth war patrol.

Design and description
The Ro-100 class was a medium-sized, coastal submarine derived from the preceding Kaichū type. They displaced  surfaced and  submerged.

For surface running, the boats were powered by two  diesel engines, each driving one propeller shaft. When submerged each propeller was driven by a  electric motor. They could reach  on the surface and  underwater.

The boats were armed with four internal bow  torpedo tubes and carried a total of eight torpedoes. They were also armed with two single mounts for  Type 96 anti-aircraft guns or a single  L/40 AA gun.

Construction and commissioning

Ro-111 was laid down as Submarine No. 402 on 20 August 1942 by Kawasaki at Kobe, Japan. She had been renamed  by the time she was launched on 26 January 1943. She was completed and commissioned on 19 July 1943.

Service history

July–November 1943
Upon commissioning, Ro-111 was attached to the Sasebo Naval District and assigned to Submarine Squadron 11 for workups. She was reassigned to Submarine Squadron 7 in the 8th Fleet on 20 July 1944. On 31 October 1943, she was reassigned to Submarine Division 30 in Submarine Squadron 8 in the Southwest Area Fleet, and she departed Kure, Japan, that day bound for Penang in Japanese-occupied British Malaya. After stopping briefly at Singapore on 16 November 1943, she got back underway the same day and reached Penang on 23 November 1943.

First war patrol
On 6 December 1943, Ro-111 departed Penang to begin her first war patrol, tasked with raiding Allied shipping in the Bay of Bengal. She attacked a British 12-ship convoy — Convoy JC.30, bound from Swansea, Wales, to Calcutta, India — in the Indian Ocean southeast of Madras, India, on 23 December 1943. One of her torpedoes struck the British 7,934-gross register ton armed cargo ship Peshawur, which was carrying 150 tons of explosives and 1,983 tons of general cargo. Peshawur′s crew — some of whom mistakenly believed an acoustic homing torpedo had hit their ship rather the wakeless Type 95 torpedo Ro-111 actually had fired — abandoned ship, and she sank two hours later. The Royal Australian Navy corvette  rescued all 134 men on board Peshawur, including her entire crew of 125 and all nine of her embarked gunners. Ro-111 returned to Penang on 29 December 1943.

Second war patrol

Ro-111 put to sea on 7 January 1944 to conduct her second war patrol, tasked with laying mines off Ceylon and then attacking Allied shipping east of Ceylon. She laid ten Type 3 mines off Elephant Rock, Ceylon, on 10 January 1944, but otherwise her patrol was uneventful, and she returned to Penang in late January 1944.

Third war patrol

Ro-111 again left Penang on 1 February 1944 to begin her third war patrol. She again operated off Ceylon, laying more mines and patrolling Ceylonese waters without finding any targets. She returned to Penang on 23 February 1944.

Fourth war patrol

Her patrol area was in the vicinity of Calcutta. In the Bay of Bengal on 16 March 1944, she attacked Convoy HC.44, which was on a voyage from Calcutta to Chittagong, India. El Madina broke in two, and her stern section sank a few minutes after the torpedo hit. While the rest of the convoy and all of its escorts left the area, the Norwegian steamer  stopped her engines and rescued El Madina′s 814 survivors. The other 380 men aboard El Madina lost their lives.

Ro-111 arrived at Penang on 25 March 1944, the same day that Submarine Division 30 was disbanded and she was reassigned to Submarine Division 51 in Submarine Squadron 7 in the Southwest Area Fleet. On 28 March 1944 she departed Penang and set course for Sasebo, Japan, which she reached in April 1944 for a refit and an overhaul.

Fifth war patrol
After completion of the work, Ro-111 departed Sasebo on 22 May 1944 bound for Truk, which she reached on 31 May 1944. She got underway from Truk on 4 June 1944 for her fifth war patrol, headed for a patrol area north of the Admiralty Islands. On 7 June 1944, she transmitted a routine situation report while operating as part of a submarine patrol line south of Truk. The Japanese never heard from her again.

Loss

On 10 June 1944, an FM-2 Wildcat fighter from the United States Navy escort aircraft carrier  sighted an oil slick on the surface north of the Admiralty Islands which betrayed the presence of Ro-111. The destroyer , operating as part of a hunter-killer group centered around Hoggatt Bay, left Hoggatt Bay′s screen to investigate. Taylor made sonar contact on Ro-111 and dropped two patterns of depth charges, but her crew observed no sign that they had damaged the submarine. After Taylor stopped to improve her sonar contact, Ro-111 surfaced about  ahead of her at 15:41. Taylor opened fire on Ro-111 with her  guns and 40 mm antiaircraft guns, scoring at least ten  and numerous 40 mm hits on her conning tower. Taylor then passed through the oil slick and dropped a pattern of depth charges, and at 15:58 her crew heard two large underwater explosions which marked the end of Ro-111.

On 13 June 1944, Ro-111 was ordered to proceed to a new patrol area south of Guam at flank speed, and on 22 June 1944 Submarine Division 51 headquarters ordered her to return to Truk, but she acknowledged neither order. On 12 July 1944, the Imperial Japanese Navy declared Ro-111 to be presumed lost with all 54 men on board. The Japanese struck her from the Navy list on 10 August 1944.

Notes

References
 

1943 ships
Ships built by Kawasaki Heavy Industries
World War II submarines of Japan
Japanese submarines lost during World War II
Ro-100-class submarines
Ships lost with all hands
Maritime incidents in June 1944
World War II shipwrecks in the Pacific Ocean
Submarines sunk by United States warships